The 7th Kanonloppet was a motor race, run to Formula One rules, held on 20 August 1961 at the Karlskoga Circuit, Sweden. The race was run over 30 laps of the little circuit, and was won by British driver Stirling Moss in a Lotus 18/21, run by the UDT Laystall Racing Team.

This race featured some local drivers who did not compete regularly in Formula One, and also the multiple world motorcycle champion Geoff Duke.

Stirling Moss arrived late at the circuit and missed the practice and qualifying sessions, but was allowed to start from the back of the grid.

Results

References

 "The Grand Prix Who's Who", Steve Small, 1995.

Kanonloppet
Kanonloppet